Miglutė Gerdaitytė (born 21 January 1940 in Šiauliai, Lithuania) is a physician and signatory of the 1990 Act of the Re-Establishment of the State of Lithuania.

Gerdaitytė received her degree in medicine from Vilnius University in 1963 and returned to practice in Šiauliai, going on to serve as the chief physician in its regional hospital.

References

1940 births
Living people
Lithuanian women physicians
Vilnius University alumni
People from Šiauliai
Signatories of the Act of the Re-Establishment of the State of Lithuania